Henry James Wilson Scherren (10 February 1843 – 25 April 1911), usually known as Henry Scherren or in encyclopaedia articles as H. Sc. was the author of various books on natural history for adults and children, with notable illustrations including some in colour, and a contributor to the Encyclopædia Britannica on natural history topics. He was a fellow of the Zoological Society of London, of which he wrote a magnificent but inaccurate history.

Life

Scherren's family came from Weymouth in Dorset. The son of a bookseller and printer, he became a compositor and moved to London. After being educated at the new St. Joseph's Foreign Missionary College started by the Mill Hill Missionaries, he joined the Catholic Carthusian monastic order in France. However, he abandoned the order in his mid-thirties to return to secular life, going on to work on the editorial staff of Messrs. Cassell & Co. in London for two decades. In the mid-1890s he moved, with his wife Anna, into a three-storey terraced house (9, Cavendish Road) in the newly built South Harringay estate in north London, living there for the rest of his life.

Scherren assisted Robert Hunter with his 7-volume Encyclopedic Dictionary (1879–88). In 1891 he wrote to Nature about a finding of a rare "hydrozoon", Cordylophora lacustris. He collected insect specimens which he shared with other naturalists.

Scherren was a Fellow of the Zoological Society of London. He was Assistant Natural History Editor of The Field. He was the author of several books on natural history for both adults and children, including Popular History of Animals for Young People and Ponds and Rock Pools.

He contributed various articles on hybrid animals including Bears, and wrote energetically about hybrids such as the Pumapard.

In 1905, Scherren published his history of the Zoological Society of London. It began:

Scherren's history of the ZSL was criticised as inaccurate by John Bastin:

Scherren contributed to several natural history articles for the 1911 Encyclopædia Britannica (where he is recorded by his initials "H. Sc."), including 'Platypus'.

Works

 Robert Hunter, Henry Scherren, and John Williams. The Encyclopædic Dictionary. 7 volumes. Cassell. 1879–1888.
 Henry Scherren. Ponds and Rock Pools, with hints on collecting for and the management of the micro-aquarium. The Religious Tract Society. 1894.
 Henry Scherren. Popular History of Animals for Young People, with 13 coloured plates and numerous illustrations in the text. Cassell. 1895. (Republished as Popular Natural History, etc. 1906, 1913
 Henry Scherren. Through a Pocket Lens. The Religious Tract Society. 1897.
 Henry Scherren. Walks and Talks in the Zoo. The Religious Tract Society. 1900.
 Henry Scherren. A Short History of the Zoological Society of London. The Zoological Society. 1901.
 Henry Scherren. Popular Natural History of the Lower Animals (Invertebrates). The Religious Tract Society. 1903.
 Henry Scherren. The Zoological Society of London : a sketch of its foundation and development, and the story of its farm, museum, gardens, menagerie and library. Cassell, 1905.
 Platypus (in part). Encyclopædia Britannica, 1911.

See also

 Cleaning symbiosis
 Congolese Spotted Lion
 Pumapard (quoting Scherren from The Field No 2887, 25 April 1908)

References

External links

 'Through a Pocket Lens' by Henry Scherren 1897: a book review ... 100 years later
 Scherren and the Micro-aquarium ... 100 years later

British naturalists
British editors
British male journalists
British encyclopedists
1843 births
1911 deaths
People from Harringay